Destroyer of Worlds may refer to:
"Destroyer of Worlds", a nickname of the character Linea in Stargate SG-1
Destroyer of Worlds, a 2001 album by Swedish extreme metal band Bathory
Destroyer of Worlds, a 2009 science fiction novel by Larry Niven and Edward M. Lerner
Destroyer of Worlds, a 2020 fantasy novel by Larry Correia
"Now I am become Death, the destroyer of worlds.", part of a famous quote by J. Robert Oppenheimer discussed at Influence of Bhagavad Gita